William G. Clark, Jr. (1912–1990) was an American jurist and politician who served as an associate justice of Gloucester District Court and was a member of the Massachusetts House of Representatives.

Early life
Clark was born on May 6, 1912 in Gloucester, Massachusetts. He graduated from Worcester Academy in 1931, Duke University in 1935, and the Boston University School of Law in 1938.

Political career
Clark served as a member of the Massachusetts House of Representatives from 1941 to 1942. During World War II, he worked in counter espionage for the Federal Bureau of Investigation. After the war, he was once again elected to the House of Representatives, where he served from 1947 to 1949.

Legal career
Clark began practicing law in Gloucester in 1938. In 1972 he was appointed to the Gloucester District Court by Governor Francis W. Sargent. He remained on the bench until his retirement in 1982.

Death
Clark died on November 14, 1990 at Massachusetts General Hospital.

See also
 1941–1942 Massachusetts legislature
 1947–1948 Massachusetts legislature

References

1912 births
1990 deaths
Boston University School of Law alumni
Duke University alumni
Massachusetts lawyers
Massachusetts state court judges
Republican Party members of the Massachusetts House of Representatives
People from Gloucester, Massachusetts
Worcester Academy alumni
20th-century American judges
20th-century American politicians
20th-century American lawyers